Jack Lee (born March 25, 1952) is an American songwriter and musician best known for composing the songs "Hanging on the Telephone", covered by the new wave band Blondie, "Come Back and Stay", covered by the singer Paul Young and "You Are My Lover", recorded by Suzi Quatro.

Biography
Alongside Paul Collins, Lee formed the seminal, yet short-lived Los Angeles power pop trio The Nerves.

References 

Living people
1952 births
American rock guitarists
American male guitarists
The Nerves members
20th-century American guitarists
20th-century American male musicians